Delphi Private School may be:

 Delhi Private School, Dubai, United Arab Emirates
 Delhi Private School, Sharjah, United Arab Emirates